The first Jews arrived in Mauritius from Haifa, British Palestine (now Israel), in the 1940s because they were denied entry to Palestine by the British Government. There are currently about 150 Jews in Mauritius. There is a synagogue in Curepipe, and a Jewish cemetery in Bambous. Judaism is a minor religion in Mauritius.

History

Patria and World War II

In September 1940, the Atlantic, Milos, and Pacific, picked up 3,600 Jews from Vienna, Gdańsk and Prague in Tulcea, Romania, to be sent to Palestine. The Jews that arrived in Palestine came without entry permits and were subsequently denied entry by the British government, specifically Sir Harold MacMichael, who was the High Commissioner. The British decided to deport the immigrants to either Trinidad and Tobago or Mauritius, both British colonies. On 25 November 1940, the first ship carrying the 1,800 Jews to Mauritius, the Patria, was accidentally bombed by the Haganah, who wanted the Jews to stay in Palestine. Their intentions were to cripple the ship. There were 260 fatalities and 172 injuries. There were only enough lifeboats for 805, since the capacity was 805 when the Patria was a French ship. When the British repossessed the boat, they increased the capacity to 1,800 but still had the same number of lifeboats.

The surviving Jews were sent to Atlit detainee camp. The remaining 1,584 refugees from the Atlantic who were not on the Patria were initially also imprisoned in Atlit, but were sent to Mauritius on 9 December 1940. When they arrived, they were sent to a detainment camp in Beau-Bassin.

In the camp, the detainees suffered from tropical diseases and inadequate food and clothing. Jewish organizations such as the South African Jewish Board of Deputies, the Jewish Agency, and the Zionist Federation, sent food, clothing, medicine, and religious items to the detainees. Initially, a ban on interaction between the sexes was enforced; the men were held in a former jailhouse and the women in adjacent iron huts. After the ban was lifted, 60 children were born in the camp. In total, 128 prisoners died in the camp, and were buried in the Jewish section of St. Martin Cemetery. At the end of World War II, the detainees were given the choice of returning to their former homes in Europe or immigrating to Palestine. Most chose Palestine, and on August 6, 1945, 1,320 landed in Haifa.

Present
According to the population census of 2011, there are 43 Jews in Mauritius. The current community is unrelated to the 1940s fugitives. The first Bar Mitzvah in Mauritius since World War II took place in 2000.

There is also one synagogue in Curepipe, the Amicale Maurice Israel Center, which was opened in 2005. The Saint Martin Cemetery in Saint Martin near Beau-Bassin, is the only Jewish cemetery in Mauritius. The bodies of the 127 died detainees as well as other Jewish people are buried there. Part of this has been fictionalised in Natacha Appanah's 'The Last Brother'. It relates the childhood experiences of Raj and David, a little boy from Prague.

References

Further reading

Jews
Judaism
Mauritius
British Mauritius in World War II
People exiled to Mauritius
Jews and Judaism in Mauritius